The Illinois–Missouri League was an American minor league baseball league.  The Class D league began operations in 1908, and continued through 1914 with teams located in Illinois and Missouri. The Lincoln Abes won consecutive league titles in 1912–1913. Baseball Hall of Fame members Grover Cleveland Alexander (1909 Galesburg Boosters) and Ray Schalk (1911 Taylorville Christians) are league alumni.

Cities represented: 1908–1914 
Beardstown, IL: Beardstown Infants 1909–1910 
Canton, IL: Canton Chinks 1908–1911; Canton Highlanders 1912; Canton Chinks 1913
Champaign, IL & Urbana, IL: Champaign-Urbana Velvets 1911;  Champaign Velvets 1912–1914   
Clinton, IL: Clinton Champs 1910–1912 
Galesburg, IL: Galesburg Hornets 1908; Galesburg Boosters 1909 
Hannibal, MO: Hannibal Cannibals 1908, moved to Central Association
Havana, IL: Havana Perfectos 1908 
Jacksonville, IL: Jacksonville Jacks 1910 
Kankakee, IL: Kankakee Kanks 1912–1914 
LaSalle, IL: LaSalle Blue Sox 1914 
Lincoln, IL: Lincoln Abes 1910–1914 
Macomb, IL: Macomb Potters 1908–1910 
Monmouth, IL: Monmouth Browns 1908–1909, moved to Central Association
Ottawa, IL: Ottawa Indians 1914 
Pekin, IL: Pekin Celestials 1909–1913 
Streator, IL: Streator Speedboys 1912; Streator Boosters 1913–1914 
Taylorville, IL: Taylorville Christians 1911

Standings and statistics
1908 Illinois–Missouri League
The league was formed.  Newly formed teams in Canton, Illinois, Galesburg, Illinois, Hannibal, Missouri, Havana, Illinois, Macomb, Illinois, and Monmouth, Illinois were the charter cities in the league.

 

1909 Illinois–Missouri League
Hannibal left the to join the American Association. The Havana Perfectos folded. The Beardstown Infants and Pekin Celestials joined the league.  
 

1910 Illinois–Missouri League
The teams from Galesburg and Monmouth joined the Central Association. The Clinton Champs and Lincoln Abes joined the league.  Beardstown moved to Jacksonville, Illinois on July 21, and folded with Macomb on August 17.
schedule
  Beardstown (38–26) moved to Jacksonville July 21; Jacksonville disbanded August 17; Macomb disbanded August 17.

1911 Illinois–Missouri League
New teams in Champaign-Urbana Velvets and Taylorville Christians joined the league.
schedule
 

1912 Illinois–Missouri League
Taylorville folded. The Streator Speedboys joined the league. The Champaign–Urbana Velvets changed their name to the Champaign Velvets.  Clinton moved to Kankakee, Illinois on May 16 with a 2–5 record; thereafter, they went 54–51 as the Kankakee Kanks.
schedule

1913 Illinois–Missouri League
Canton and Pekin folded on July 10, before the end of the season.  The league instituted a split–season schedule. The playoff system developed in which the best record of the first–half of the season would play the best record of the second–half of the season. 
schedule
Playoff: Lincoln won the first half, Lincoln & Champaign tied for the second half. Lincoln was awarded the championship when Champaign refused to play off the second half tie.

1914 Illinois–Missouri League
The LaSalle Blue Sox and Ottawa Indians formed and joined the league. Kankakee and Lincoln both folded on July 3, before the season ended.
schedule
 Lincoln & Kankakee disbanded July 3.Ottawa and Streator left the league to join the Bi-State League. The teams in Champaign and LaSalle folded, and the league itself folded.

References

External references
Sumner, Benjamin Barrett.  Minor League Baseball Standings:All North American Leagues, Through 1999.  Jefferson, N.C.:McFarland. 

Defunct minor baseball leagues in the United States
Baseball leagues in Illinois
Baseball leagues in Missouri
1908 establishments in Illinois
1908 establishments in Missouri
1914 disestablishments in Illinois
1914 disestablishments in Missouri